The Coupe Jean Dupuich was an international competition for football clubs from Europe that was held from 1908 to 1925 and is seen as the predecessor of the Mitropa Cup formed two years later, in 1927. It was the successor tournament of Coupe Van der Straeten Ponthoz, which was one of the first international club tournaments held in Europe. It was named in honor of the donator of the trophy Adolphe Dupuich.

History
In 1908, this international event took over from the Coupe Van der Straeten Ponthoz which had been created in 1900 by the Count of the same name. In 1907, the Brussels club Union Saint-Gilloise won that competition for the third time in a row, thus earning the right to keep the trophy, so a new trophy was therefore put into play in the following year. The new cup was offered by Mr. Alphonse Dupuich and named in honor of his son Jean, a young striker from Léopold FC who had died unexpectedly on 4 November 1906 at the age of just 20.

The inaugural tournament in 1908 was contested by 8 teams from 5 countries, Belgium, the Netherlands, France, England and Germany. Only the first 2 editions of the tournament had a quarterfinal round, from 1910 onwards only the semifinals and final were played. The tournament was held annually from 1908 until 1914 when it had to be stopped due to the outbreak of World War I. The competition was revived in 1920 and the last edition was played in 1925.

1908 Coupe Jean Dupuich
Five countries sent their best teams to the 1908 edition, with the hosts Belgium sending three clubs, Royal Léopold FC, and former Coupe Ponthoz champions Union Saint-Gilloise and Racing Club de Bruxelles. Germany sent two teams Preussen Berlin and Preussen Duisburg, while the remaining three nations sent one team each, US Tourquennoise of France, Old Xaverians of England and the Netherlands sent a Dĳxhoorn XI, which was mostly made up of players from H.B.S.) such as Vic Gonsalves, Frans de Bruijn Kops and Toine van Renterghem. The Belgian clubs were left humiliated once again, going out of the tournament with 2–8, 1–4 and 4–0 defeats. Pilgrims FC took the trophy to London after beating D.F.C. 4–2 in the final.

Results

1909 Coupe Jean Dupuich
The second edition of the Coupe Jean Dupuich saw only Belgian and English teams participate, and one of each reached the final, in which Racing Club de Bruxelles once again lost, this time 2–3 to Bishop Auckland.

Results

1910 Coupe Jean Dupuich
The third edition of the Coupe Jean Dupuich saw only four teams compete, including the defending winners Bishop Auckland and Bromley F.C. from England, both of which reached the final after beating H.V.V. and "Select Bruxelles" respectively. Both semi-finals were close affairs, with Bromley beating H.V.V. by 2 goals to 1, while Bishop Auckland was held to a 2–2 draw by a Select Bruxelles, and it remained tied after 2x7.5 and 2x5 minutes of extra-time, thus forcing a replay which was played in the following day, and since the final would take place later that day, the game was scheduled to last only 2x15 minutes, and Bishop won 1–0. In the final Bishop secured another 1–0 win to lift the trophy for the second time in a row.

Results

1911 Coupe Jean Dupuich
The fourth edition of the Coupe Jean Dupuich was a Belgian-English affair with each nation having two clubs each, and it was the English who once again dominated the competition, with Ilford F.C. beating the then Belgian powerhouse Union Saint-Gilloise (3–1), while the two-time winners Bishop Auckland managed to beat Daring Club in a thrilling 5–4 win, hence keeping alive their hopes of winning the cup for the third consecutive time, however, they failed to do so as they lost the final 0–1 to Ilford.

Results

1912 Coupe Jean Dupuich
The fifth edition of the competition witnessed Union Saint-Gilloise return to its prime, beating the current winners Ilford F.C. with a shocking 6–1 trashing, thus retributing Ilford's courtesy of the previous tournament, and then they defeated fellow Belgian Daring Club de Bruxelles 1–0.

Results

1913 Coupe Jean Dupuich
The sixth edition of the Coupe Jean Dupuich was won by Union Saint-Gilloise after two 3–2 wins over 1. FC Nürnberg in the semi-finals and Barking F.C. in the final, thus winning the competition for the second time in a row.

Results

1914 Coupe Jean Dupuich
The seventh edition of the Coupe Jean Dupuich saw Union Saint-Gilloise and Daring Club being the Belgian representatives once more, and again they reached the final which was again won by Saint-Gilloise (3–1), who lifted the trophy for the third time in a row, thus repeating the feat they had accomplished between 1906 and 1908 with Coupe Van der Straeten Ponthoz. This was also the first tournament in the competition's history that had a third-place play-off, with the losing semi-finalists, South Bank F.C. of England and VfB Leipzig of Germany, facing off for bronze, being the former who came out as 5–0 winners.

Results

1920 Coupe Jean Dupuich
Even though the competition's six-year hiatus due to World War I and the Union Saint-Gilloise three successive wins perfectly set up a second name change for the competition, the cup remained known as the Coupe Jean Dupuich, and its eight edition in 1920 counted with two Belgians clubs and one each from France and England. The semi-finals between Daring Club de Bruxelles and US Tourquennoise set a CJD all-time record for the highest scoring match with a total of 13 goals, as the Belgians trashed the French with a resounding 10–3 win. The third-place match then broke that same record when Middlessex League of England trashed the same French team 15–1. The final was thus an all-Belgian affair in which Racing Club/Léopold FC defeated Daring Club 3–2.

Results

1922 Coupe Jean Dupuich
The ninth edition of the Coupe Jean Dupuich saw another all-Belgian final between Racing Club/Léopold FC and Daring Club, which ended with the same winner, but this time with a 2–1 win.

Results

1923 Coupe Jean Dupuich
The tenth edition of this competition was marked by the return of Union Saint-Gilloise, who was way past its prime and ended up being knocked out in the semi-finals by Feyenoord Rotterdam, who thus become the first-ever non-Belgian and non-English team to reach the final of the Coupe Jean Dupuich, although they lost it to Daring Club de Bruxelles (2–0).

Results

1924 Coupe Jean Dupuich
The eleventh edition of the Jean Dupuich was contested by two teams from Belgium and one each from the Netherlands and Czechoslovakia. The representative of the latter was a Prague selection, which faced a Brussels selection in the semi-finals, which ended in a  4–1 win to the hosts. In the other semi-final clash, Darling defeated FC Dordrecht 5–0, thus reaching their fourth consecutive final after having previously lost in 1920 and 1922, and won in 1923. The final was thus an all-Belgium affair and it ended in a 1–1 draw, a result that remained unaltered even after two prologantions were played, so the 22 players decide to keep the draw until the end and both are given as the winner, with each team receiving a decreased trophy.

Results

1925 Coupe Jean Dupuich
The eleventh and last edition of the Coupe Jean Dupuich was won by Union Saint-Gilloise after beating Feyenoord Rotterdam 1–0 in the semi-finals and then St Albans 2–0 in the final. Another notable result was the semi-finals between St Albans and Entente bruxelloise (Brussels agreement), which ended in a 6–4 win in the favour of the English.

Results

Champions

List of finals

Titles by club

Titles by country

See also
Coupe Van der Straeten Ponthoz
Challenge International du Nord

References

External links
Coupe Jean Dupuich results

Defunct international club association football competitions in Europe
Belgian football friendly trophies
Dutch football friendly trophies
Swiss football friendly trophies
French football friendly trophies
English football friendly trophies
Recurring sporting events established in 1908